United States v. Simms, 5 U.S. (1 Cranch) 252 (1803), was a United States Supreme Court case. It was one of a series of cases dealing with the applicability of previous laws in the newly created District of Columbia.

Background 
Prior to the creation of the District of Columbia in 1801, Virginia created a private right of action to enforce most of its criminal statutes.  It was illegal in Virginia to operate a billiards parlor, a faro table, or any of a number of other gambling operations from one's house.  The law provided that the penalty would be a fine of 150 pounds payable to any party that would file suit against the operator.

When the District of Columbia was formed the acts of Congress that created the district, also created a contradictory legal situation.  They held that within the portion of the District of Columbia that had previously been Virginia territory the laws of Virginia would continue to apply.  However, it also held that all suits for breach of the peace or other laws within the district must be prosecuted in the name of the United States and that fines would be payable to the United States.  This led to a contradiction because the Virginia law, which was supposedly still in force, had no such requirement.

Decision
The Court held that it was the object of Congress not to change in any respect the existing laws further than the new situation of the District rendered indispensably necessary.  Thus qui tam remedies enacted before the creation of the District should persist.

See also
 History of Washington, D.C.
List of United States Supreme Court cases, volume 5

Notes and references

External links
 

1803 in the United States
1803 in United States case law
United States Supreme Court cases
United States Supreme Court cases of the Marshall Court
Criminal cases in the Marshall Court
Legal history of the District of Columbia